The Mechanicville Bridge (also known as the Hemstreet Park Bridge) carries New York State Route 67 across the Hudson River in New York connecting Mechanicville with Hemstreet Park in the Town of Schaghticoke. The bridge was built in 1950 as a replacement for a structure privately built as a toll bridge in 1888, and is referred to by some as the Champlain Canal Bridge.

See also
List of fixed crossings of the Hudson River

References

External links

Bridges over the Hudson River
Road bridges in New York (state)
Former toll bridges in New York (state)